Os Flagelados do Vento Leste (Portuguese meaning "The Victims Of The East Wind") is a novel published in 1960 by Cape Verdean author Manuel Lopes. Along with Claridade, Baltazar Lopes participated with Manuel Lopes and Jorge Barbosa with founded members of the review and the name was the movement in the main activists of the same.

The novel was awarded the Meio Milénio do Achamento das Ilhas de Cabo Verde award. The novel was adapted into a movie directed by António Faria in 1987.

References

External links
Os Flagelados do Vento Leste at livroditera.blogspot.com

Flagelados do Vento Leste
Flagelados do Vento Leste
Flagelados do Vento Leste
Books by Manuel Lopes
Films based on Cape Verdean novels
Flagelados
Cape Verdean novels adapted into films